Council Grounds State Park is a  Wisconsin state park on the Wisconsin River.  It was originally a Merrill city park that was donated to the state in 1938, evolving in designation from a state roadside park to a state forest to full state park status in 1978.  The Works Progress Administration planted trees and built visitor amenities. The name Council Grounds comes from reports that the site was once used for seasonal gatherings of Native Americans.

External links
Council Grounds State Park official site

Protected areas of Lincoln County, Wisconsin
State parks of Wisconsin
Protected areas established in 1938
Works Progress Administration in Wisconsin
1938 establishments in Wisconsin